The Samsung Galaxy Folder 2 is a smartphone released in 2017 by Samsung. This device initially launched in China and South Korea with a price of roughly $250, placing it in the lower mid-range smartphone price category. This phone's main feature is its unusual form factor, combining a flip phone with a smartphone. The Galaxy Folder 2 was often praised for its metallic build and unique form factor, but is also noted as being impractical and possibly overpriced.

References 

Samsung Galaxy
Android (operating system) devices
Samsung smartphones
Mobile phones introduced in 2017